The following list includes notable hip hop satirists and satirical rappers.

Artists
Hip hop satirists
Lil B
Tupac Shakur
Lil Wayne
Snoop Dogg
Odd Future
Little Brother 
De La Soul 
Mighty Casey 
Childish Gambino 
Tyler, the Creator

Meme or ironic rappers

Yung Gravy
Rucka Rucka Ali
Rich Brian
Ugly God
Bbno$
The Lonely Island
Pink Guy
PolitikZ
Cal Churchesta
3PAC
Unknown P

References

Hip hop
Satirists